Bolehall is a village in Staffordshire, England, part of the Tamworth Conurbation. The village sits on the south bank of the River Anker. The parish of Bolehall and Glascote, was historically part of Warwickshire.

History
The manor of Bole Hall is first recorded in 1390 when it was owned by Lord John de Clinton and his wife Elizabeth, who held it after John's death. Following Elizabeth's death in 1423, the manor passed to the Earl of Warwick. The manor was reported as being in ruins by 1515.
 
In 1782 the manor passed to the Viscount Townsend of the nearby Tamworth Castle. The manor was purchased by the Corporation of Tamworth in 1897 with the castle.

Media 
Tamworth Informed serves the area as a media source via their dedicated news website.

Places of Interest
Bolehall Viaduct - Known locally as 'The 19 Arches' - Grade II listed railway viaduct.
Bole Hall - Formerly Bolehall House - historic manor constructed c.1700.
Warwickshire Moor - Local nature reserve and wetlands area.

References

See also
Listed buildings in Tamworth, Staffordshire

Areas of Tamworth, Staffordshire